Created in 1981, the Eisenhower Foundation is the private sector continuation of two Presidential Commissions – the 1967-1968 bipartisan National Advisory Commission on Civil Disorders (the Kerner Riot Commission, after the big city protests in Detroit, Newark, Los Angeles, and many other cities) and the 1968-1969 bipartisan National Commission on the Causes and Prevention of Violence (the National Violence Commission, after the assassinations of Dr. Martin Luther King and Senator Robert F. Kennedy).

Commissions

Kerner Commission
The Kerner Riot Commission famously concluded, "Our nation is moving toward two societies, one black, one white – separate and unequal." The Commission said it was "time to make good the promises of American democracy to all citizens – urban and rural, white, black, Spanish surname, American Indians, and every minority group."  The panel viewed the federal government as the only institution with the authority and resources to create change "at a scale equal to the dimensions of the problem."  The "most persistent and serious grievances" were unemployment and underemployment. Inadequate education, segregation, and a racially biased criminal justice system also were pressing grievances.  The Commission, therefore, called for well-funded and sustained federal investments – "new initiatives and experiments" for employment, job training, improved education, adequate housing, livable income support, vigorous civil rights enforcement, and police reform.  In addition, "Important segments of the media failed to report adequately on the causes of civil disorders and on the underlying problems of race relations." The Kerner Commission concluded that, nationally, new attitudes, new understanding, and, above all, "new will" would be necessary to carry out its recommendations.

U.S. National Commission on the Causes and Prevention of Violence
The Kerner Commission report was issued in March 1968.  In April 1968 Dr. King was assassinated, and in June 1968 Senator Kennedy was assassinated. The National Violence Commission then was formed.  In its final report the following year, the Violence Commission, as the Kerner Commission, concluded, the most important policy issue was the lack of employment and educational opportunity in inner city neighborhoods – set within a larger American economy that prized material success and within a tradition of violence that the media transmitted particularly well:

To be a young, poor male; to be undereducated and without means of escape from an oppressive urban environment; to want what the society claims is available (but mostly to others); to see around oneself illegitimate and often violent methods being used to achieve material success, and to observe others using these means with impunity – all this is to be burdened with an enormous set of influences that pull many toward crime and delinquency. To be also a Negro, Mexican, or Puerto Rican American and subject to discrimination and segregation adds considerably to the pull of these other criminogenic forces.

The Commission recommended new investments in jobs, training, and education of $20B per year in 1968 dollars. A long-run "reordering of national priorities" was in order, said the Violence Commission, which shared the Kerner Commission's moral vision that there could be no higher claim on the nation's conscience.  A majority of the members of the National Violence Commission, including both Republicans and Democrats, recommended confiscation of most handguns, restrictions on new handgun ownership to those who could demonstrate reasonable need, and identification of rifle and shotgun owners.  When in human history other great civilizations have fallen, concluded the Violence Commission, "it was less often from external assault than from internal decay ... The greatness and durability of most civilizations have been finally determined by how they have responded to these challenges from within. Ours will be no exception."

Trustees
Founding and other early Eisenhower Foundation Trustees included: A. Leon Higginbotham, Vice Chairman of the National Violence Commission, and Federal and Third Circuit Court of Appeals Judge and Professor of Law at the University of Pennsylvania and later at Harvard; Fred R. Harris, Member of the Kerner Riot Commission and United States Senator; Nicholas deB Katzenbach, Chairman of the President's Commission on Law Enforcement and Administration of Justice and Attorney General of the United States; David Ginsburg, Executive Director of the Kerner Riot Commission and Counselor to the President during the Johnson Administration; Milton S. Eisenhower, Chairman of the National Violence Commission and President Emeritus of Johns Hopkins University; Patricia Roberts Harris, Member of the National Violence Commission and Secretary of Housing and Urban Development; Edward W. Brooke, Member of the Kerner Riot Commission and United States Senator; Marvin E. Wolfgang, Co-Director of Research on the National Violence Commission and Professor of Criminology at the University of Pennsylvania; Henry G. Cisneros, Secretary of Housing and Urban Development and Mayor of San Antonio; Lloyd N. Cutler, Executive Director of the National Violence Commission and Counselor to Presidents Carter and Clinton; Elmer B. Staats, Comptroller General of the United States; James W. Rouse, President of the Rouse Corporation and Founder of the Enterprise Foundation; and Frank Stanton, President of CBS, Inc, and Chairman of the American Red Cross.

In 2015, Trustees included Dr. Charles Austin, Foundation Chairman and formerly the first African American former Police Chief and City Manager of Columbia SC; Professor James Comer, Founder of the Child Study Center at Yale University; Mr. Pablo Eisenberg, former Executive Director of the Center for Community Change in Washington D.C.; Mr. Jeff Faux, Founder of the Economic Policy Institute in Washington D.C; Ms. Marilyn Melkonian, Founder of the Telesis Corporation in Washington D.C. and former Deputy Assistant Secretary for Housing at HUD during the Carter Administration; Dr. Dora Nevares, Professor of Law at Inter-American University, San Juan PR; Dr. Joseph Duffey, former Director of the United States Information Agency and of the National Endowment for the Humanities; Mr. Thomas Frazier, former Police Commissioner of Baltimore MD; Dr. Andrew Hahn, Professor at the Heller Graduate School for Social Policy and Management at Brandeis University; Mr. John Knott, Chief Executive Officer of the Noisette Company in Charleston SC; Professor Richard Lerner, Founder of the Institute of Applied Research in Youth Development at Tufts University; Dr. Robert McChesney, Professor of Communications at the University of Illinois; Ms. Loretta Metoxen, Tribal Historian of the Oneida Nation in Wisconsin; Mr. Darrel Stephens, Executive Director of the Major Cities Police Chief Association and Mr. Roger Wilkins, Clarence J. Robinson Professor Emeritus of History and American Culture at George Mason University.

The Foundation's Founding President and CEO (and also a Founding Trustee) are Alan Curtis. Curtis was co-author of the Crimes of Violence Task Force on the National Violence Commission, the first Executive Director of President Jimmy Carter's Urban and Regional Policy Group, which formulated the President's National Urban Policy, and Administrator of the Urban Initiatives Anti-Crime Program in public housing, which was a component of the National Urban Policy.  Curtis later built on this experience as Eisenhower Foundation programs were implemented.

Mindful of the findings of the two Commissions, Curtis, and other Founding Eisenhower Foundation Trustees defined the organization's mission as identifying, financing, replicating, evaluating, communicating, advocating for, and scaling up politically feasible multiple solution initiatives – wraparound and evidence-based strategies that work for the inner city and high-risk racial minority youth.

Framing Solutions Before They Became Fashionable 
In its programs and policy reports, beginning in the 1980s and 1990s, the Foundation has articulated principles and themes that, decades later, have become widely accepted.  For example: *Beginning with a 1985 National Violence Commission update, the Foundation called for "[inner city] solutions that are supported by scientific research."  In a 1990 report, the Foundation argued that "higher standards of evaluation are needed."  Today, "evidence-based" policy is actively pursued and has become widely accepted in the public and private sectors.
 Through Congressional testimony titled, "Doing What Works" in 1991 and through a 1993 Kerner Riot Commission update, the Foundation has advocated that policy should expand on what works and discontinue what doesn't work.  In his 2008 Inaugural Address, President Obama stressed his Administration would "build on what works."
 In 1985 and 1990 reports, the Foundation called for a "bubble up" inner city policy implemented by local, indigenous nonprofit organizations.  Today there is a substantial constituency of practitioners and policymakers who articulate "bubble up" grassroots-based policy rather than "trickle down" policy imposed by large public and private institutions.
 Beginning in 1985 and continuing with 1990 and 1997 reports, the Foundation has argued against siloed interventions and for interrelated, wraparound, self-reinforcing "multiple solutions to multiple problems" targeted at specific inner-city neighborhoods.  Today, such policy is, among other descriptors, called "place-based." It is illustrated by the Department of Education Promise Neighborhoods – and related initiatives at HUD, the Department of Justice, and other agencies.
 Building on the original National Violence Commission reports and carrying into all updates of the Violence and Kerner Commission, the Foundation has called for community-based, problem-oriented policing that is more sensitive to racial minorities and argued against the expansion of the racially biased prison-industrial complex.  Today, after scores of highly publicized killings by police of minorities, especially youth, there is widespread concern over police insensitivity to racial minorities – and a growing movement to reduce the prison population.

Organizing Inner City Neighborhoods:  Ford Foundation Support 
Funded by the Ford Foundation, IBM, and many local matching partners, the Foundation launched a national ten-site neighborhood-based youth development and crime prevention demonstration program in the early and mid-1980s.

The Foundation subgranted indigenous nonprofit organizations modest resources – typically $50,000 to $70,000 total over 36 months.  The priority was on community organizing.  Some sites did much more.  The most successful venture was Around the Corner to the World in the Adams-Morgan neighborhood of Washington DC.  The program evolved from Jubilee Housing, a cornerstone nonprofit enterprise created by developer James Rouse (a former Eisenhower Foundation Trustee) and his Enterprise Foundation.  The Foundation raised substantial additional funding from the Department of Health and Human Services, enabling the start-up of a weatherization business that created jobs for unemployed young adults.  Although a Rutgers University evaluation was not able to create control or comparison groups, the criminal involvement of the participants dropped sharply, while a very different pattern developed in Adams Morgan and Washington, DC as a whole.

For all 10 of the Ford Foundation-funded sites nationally, some of the practical street-level lessons were that:
 Inner city indigenous nonprofit organizations can be effective leaders in prevention and youth development.
 Technical assistance to nonprofits increases the odds of success.
 It is folly to expect success without adequate resources.
 Political rhetoric like "volunteerism," "self-sufficiency" and "empowerment" often are smokescreen's for failure to commit sufficient resources.
 More prevention partnerships and trust need to be generated among inner-city nonprofit organizations, community residents, youth, and police.
Applying these lessons and securing new funding from the Department of Health and Human Services and other sources, the Foundation continued to replicate neighborhood-based prevention in other locations. Eisenhower Foundation staff provided technical assistance to enhance the institutional capacity of local nonprofit organizations.

Creating Inner City Youth Safe Havens and Police Ministations
Built on the practical experiences of these early demonstrations, a new Eisenhower Foundation model emerged in the late 1980s and early 1990s – the Youth Safe Haven-Police Ministration Program.  The Foundation merged two concepts.  The first evolved from the Carnegie Corporation's landmark 1992 report, A Matter of Time, which showed how inner city youth were at the highest risk after school, from 3:00 pm to 8:00 pm. Hence the need for safe haven programs run by nonprofit organizations after school for primary school children and middle school youth. The other concept was the "koban" – the Japanese notion of a neighborhood police administration.  There are thousands of kobans across Japan.  Arguably they are among the leading reasons for Japan's historically low crime rates.

With funding from Japanese corporations, the Japanese Keidanren (an organization of major Japanese corporations), and the Center for Global Partnership, the Foundation led several delegations of American police chiefs, other senior American police officials, and American inner city community leaders to Japan to observe kobans.  Upon return home, the Foundation funded delegates with the most interest to implement a synthesis of Carnegie-inspired safe havens and Japanese-inspired kobans. The resulting Safe Haven-Ministations are run and led by American indigenous inner-city nonprofit organizations. The nonprofits provide space after school for children and middle school youth. The young people are mentored by civilians who also provide homework assistance, computer learning, youth development guidance, sports and cultural activities, and advocacy in support of participants.  The advocacy includes meetings with parents, teachers, and if necessary, the criminal justice system.  Importantly, at the same time, the police come to the safe haven and mentor children and youth.  Police also undertake problem-solving, community-based policing in the immediate neighborhood.

For the first generation of Safe Haven-Ministration implementation back home in America, the Foundation matched Japanese funding with resources from the United States Department of Justice.  Over the 1990s, the initial Safe Haven-Ministations were implemented in, among other places, Boston, Chicago, Philadelphia, and San Juan. Serious crime reported to the FBI declined from between 22 percent and 27 percent in the neighborhoods where the program was located in these cities.  The declines were significantly greater than declines in other nearby, comparable neighborhoods and in their host cities as a whole.  The findings were statistically significant.

In his book Crime and Punishment in America, which was a finalist for the Pulitzer Prize, University of California, Irvine, criminologist, and former Eisenhower Foundation Trustee Elliott Currie observed:

Each [Safe Haven-Ministation] site mixed community policing with a variety of youth development initiatives.  The San Juan program, for example, operated in Caimito, an extremely poor neighborhood with high unemployment and school dropout rates. A well-established Puerto Rican nonprofit organization, Centro Sister Isolina Ferre, established a "campus" in Caimito that joined a neighborhood police koban with classrooms, small businesses, and recreation facilities.  There were computer and office skills training classes, daycare, alternative schools for dropouts, health screenings and immunization for neighborhood children, and an after-school "safe haven" program for six-to-twelve-year-olds.

Centro also hired "streetwise" young people to work as youth advocates (or "intercessors"), mediating among neighborhood youth, the schools, and the justice system.  These advocates worked closely with the koban-based police, who would contact them when local youths were detained.  In pursuit of what the [Eisenhower] foundation calls "community equity policing," the youth advocates and neighborhood residents worked as genuine partners with the police; community leaders even helped to select and train the koban-based officers.  Estimating the impact of local programs like these on crime rates is intrinsically difficult, but a careful evaluation found that serious crimes fell significantly over 4 years of the program in Centro's target neighborhood – considerably more so than in the city as a whole.

The San Juan Safe Haven-Ministation was residential and had three floors.  A koban officer lived with his family on the top floor.  The next floor housed day-to-day koban activity.  The bottom floor was the computer center for instruction with youth.  At first, Caimito residents were distrustful of the police.  Then a cow died in the street.  The police took it upon themselves to dispose of the cow.  The community appreciated it.  Relations began to improve.  San Juan became a model site and hosted a national technical assistance conference attended by American site directors, American police, and Japanese police. Eventually, senior staff from Centro were asked by the San Juan Police to teach a course at the police academy.

In another of the initial Safe Haven-Ministations funded by the Foundation, in Boston at the Dorchester Youth Collaborative, youth were covered nationally by NBC and invited to a crime prevention rally in Washington, DC.  Speaking on stage with President Bill Clinton and Attorney General Janet Reno, Eddie Katunda, one of the Safe Haven-ministation youth said, "I'd like to introduce community police officer Harold White and Tony Platt ... Back in the day, I used to hate the police ... Harold and Tony have changed all that."

Beyond Boston, San Juan, Chicago, and Philadelphia, other cities with evidence-based Safe Haven-Ministation success include Columbia SC, Canton OH, Jackson MS, Baltimore MD, and Dover, NH.  Funders have included the Department of Justice, the Department of Housing and Urban Development, the Department of Education, and the Ford, Casey, and Kellogg foundations.

Under the leadership of Columbia SC's first African American Police Chief, Dr. Charles Austin, who had been a member of one of the Foundation's delegations to Japan and presently is the Foundation's Chairman, Columbia kobans were replicated citywide.  They included a residential Safe Haven-Ministation where 2 young African-American police officers lived.  The success of Columbia was featured in a national story on ABC World News Tonight with Peter Jennings. ABC reported "Serious crime has dropped by about a third with the koban program.  The crime rate in the rest of Columbia stayed the same."

In New Hampshire, the success in Dover led to the first attempt to launch a statewide system of Safe Haven-Ministations, with replications in 3 other locations.

The Canton OH program integrated the safe haven concept with the Full Service Community Schools concept. With Department of Education funding, the Foundation has replicated Full-Service Community Schools in Iowa, Maryland, Pennsylvania, and Washington State.  The replications were guided by Joy Dryfoos, the Eisenhower Foundation Trustee who founded the Full Service Community School movement.  The Foundation believes there is great potential for replicating such integrated Safe Haven-Full Service Community School ventures, as part of targeted multiple solutions.

The Safe Haven-Ministation has been identified as a best practice model technical assistance guide released by the Department of Housing and Urban Development.

Besides the ABC coverage, stories on the Safe Haven-Ministation programs have appeared on CBS, BBC and many local network television outlets.  Stories also have appeared in the New York Times, Washington Post, Wall Street Journal, Guardian, Economist, Ashai Evening News (Japan), Mianchi Shimbun (Japan) and many American regional newspapers – as well as in Time and Newsweek.  (See the Bibliography, for local television and newspaper stories.)

Perhaps best illustrated by the police killing of Michael Brown in Ferguson, MO in 2014 and the 2015 protests in West Baltimore over police mistreatment of Freddie Gray, the racial tension that now exists between minority youth and police in America is motivating the Foundation to seek more extensive scaling up of Safe Havens-Ministations in many more cities.  The model promises to simultaneously reduce crime, reduce citizen fear, improve the lives of children and youth, and improve community-police trust.  The Foundation frames the Safe Haven-Ministation model as a more successful alternative to past hard line, "zero tolerance," "stop and frisk" and "broken windows" strategies of policing that have led to the police killings and present racial tension.

Creating Quantum Opportunities 
The Eisenhower Foundation has found that, while popular with minority youth from about ages 7 to 12, Safe Haven-Ministations were of less interest to high-risk minority high school youth, who had different developmental needs and who more often were in conflict with police.  The Foundation established another model, the Quantum Opportunities Program.  Eisenhower Quantum was a refined, revised, and reinvented version of an earlier Quantum – which had experienced initial success but then was not successful in scaling up replications.

With the Department of Justice and private sector resources, the Foundation funded local, indigenous nonprofit organizations to invest in cohorts of the highest risk racial minority youth in the highest risk high schools in the highest risk inner-city neighborhoods.  The investments were after school, on weekends and in summers over all 4 years of high school.  Quantum interventions consist of intense mentoring with and advocacy for the youth, tutoring and homework assistance, life skills training, college preparation, youth leadership training and modest stipends.  In a randomized control evaluation of Quantum Opportunities for African American and Latino youth in Albuquerque NM, Baltimore MD, Boston MA, Milwaukee WI and New Bedford MA from 2010 to 2014, Quantum participants in all the locations combined had higher grades, much higher graduation rates and much higher college acceptance rates.  See Figures 1 and 2.

Because of the high statistical significance of these Eisenhower Quantum outcomes, outside peer reviewers designated Quantum a national Department of Justice exemplary evidence-based model with the highest possible rating, as posted in a write-up on the official Justice "crime solutions" website: http://www.crimesolutions.gov/ProgramDetails.aspx?ID=426.

The National Mentoring Resource Center, funded by the Department of Justice, also designated Quantum a national model: http://www.nationalmentoringresourcecenter.org/index.php/what-works-in-mentoring/reviews-of-mentoring-programs.html.  In its peer-reviewed commentary, the National Mentoring Resource Center observed:

[The Eisenhower Foundation Quantum evaluation report] is a treasure-trove for practitioners, full of all kinds of useful; tips, such as the perception across sites that the program's emphasis on graduation, not grade improvement, as the primary goal really helped youth feel more comfortable in the program.  Apparently, working slowly toward the long-term graduation goal, with long-term support, felt like a better starting point that emphasized immediate academic improvements.  That makes sense, yet it's the type of subtle distinction in program design that probably would have gone completely unmentioned had this evaluation not included qualitative data.  One can hope that future efforts funded by both private philanthropies and public agencies like OJJDP [the Office of Juvenile Justice and Delinquency Prevention at the Department of Justice] will include similarly detailed and useful information on program replications and implementation in their evaluation reports.

In addition, Quantum was featured in an ABC Boston interview with the program director and in other media stories.  The private nonprofit sector national Child Trends organization joined the Department of Justice and the National Mentoring Resource Center in designating Quantum a national model: http://www.childtrends.org/?programs=quantum-opportunities-program-eisenhower-foundation.

As a result of these evidence-based peer-reviewed model program designations, and more designations that are anticipated from other institutions, the Foundation is seeking to scale up Quantum and develop a plan for national sustainability. The Foundation believes that Quantum is needed at Michael Brown's Normandy High School in Ferguson MO and in thousands of other high-risk inner-city high schools across the nation.

Eisenhower Quantum has emerged at a time when serious urban school system controversies continue over administrative organization, charter schools, testing, teacher training, teacher union power, and many related issues.  The failed No Child Left Behind Act has been replaced by the untested Every Student Succeeds Act, which already has garnered considerable criticism.  Quantum avoids many of the institutional debates – because Quantum is community nonprofit-based, not school-based.  In the just completed evaluation, above, Quantum succeeded even in underperforming high schools. Hence Curtis believes the expansion of Quantum can reach students who otherwise might drop out.  Quantum can achieve this goal regardless of the state of national education debates and the competence of local high schools.  Quantum is an alternative evidence-based model.

As part of multiple solutions, the Foundation has replicated inner-city job training programs that can work in concert with Quantum Opportunities.  Some Eisenhower Foundation-funded ventures, like Project Prepare, run by the nonprofit Youth Guidance organization in Chicago, have offered job training to youth still in high school – with successful outcomes in terms of improving job preparedness, reducing the risk of dropping out and securing employment after graduation.  Other programs, especially Department of Labor-funded Eisenhower Foundation replications of the Argus Learning for Living model created in the South Bronx by Elizabeth Sturz (who was an Eisenhower Foundation Trustee), include many Quantum components – but work with youth and young adults who have dropped out of high school.  The Eisenhower Foundation has successfully replicated Argus in Des Moines IA and Washington DC. The Foundation also has collaborated with the San Francisco-based Delancey Street Foundation to replicate proven principles of ex-offender job training in Virginia and South Carolina.

As part of its multiple solutions to multiple problems framework, the Foundation is planning future Quantum replications for youth in high school combined with Argus replications at the same location for youth who have dropped out.

In a 1995 New York Times contribution, "Welfare Reform That Can Work," Foundation President Alan Curtis criticized the "welfare reform" legislation that was being debated at the time and called for alternative education and job training reforms, based in part on Quantum and Argus, as much more likely to solve long run problems. Along these lines, Mark Shriver, son of Sargent Shriver, who was the first director of President John Kennedy's anti-poverty program, observed in an op-ed on Eisenhower Foundation initiatives that the "Wall Street Journal has endorsed model programs like Argus in the Bronx, yet these program are also consistent with Mobilization for Youth, a 'war-on-poverty' initiative of the 1960s."

Updating the Presidential Commissions and Communicating the Findings 
As the Eisenhower Foundation has completed inner city program replications and evaluations, Curtis and other Trustees have authored or coauthored reports designed to communicate what has worked – and to learn from what has not worked.

Youth Investment and Community Reconstruction.  Youth Investment and Community Reconstruction, the Foundation's 10th-anniversary report, on the 10-site inner city Ford Foundation funded youth development and crime prevention program in the early 1980s, Quantum was reviewed online by the Department of Justice National Criminal Justice Reference Service:

This report summarizes the results and lessons of the Milton S. Eisenhower Foundation's demonstrations during the last decade; describes the resulting next generation of private-sector ventures; and proposes new, politically feasible national policies for the inner city that builds on the Foundation's practical experience in daily street-level implementation.

The Milton S. Eisenhower Foundation has worked since the early 1980s to implement the agendas of the President's National Advisory Commission on Civil Disorders and the National Commission on the Causes and Prevention of Violence. In so doing, it has focused on reducing urban violence and drug abuse through youth empowerment, community revitalization, and grassroots action. In 1982 the Foundation launched a neighborhood self-help crime prevention program in 10 inner cities, based on the aforementioned principles. Through trial and error over the last decade, the Foundation has learned as much from failure as success. As a result, there are now some answers to formerly intractable questions. Issues examined in this report are the effectiveness of specific anticrime and antidrug strategies such as neighborhood watch in the inner city, the relative roles of minority nonprofit community organizations and the police, the relative roles of private organizations and public agencies, and the uses and limitation of volunteers in inner cities. Also addressed is whether a policy should invest simultaneously in both individual high-risk youth and the neighborhoods where they live ... The central conclusion of this report is that community-based organizations can create effective strategies to reduce crime and drug abuse in inner cities, so long as comprehensive programs are carefully designed and adequately funded.

The report was covered as an exclusive in the Washington Post by columnist David Broder. Through syndication, the Broder column appeared in many newspapers across the nation.  Internationally, the report was covered by the Economist.

Youth Investment and Police Mentoring, the report written on the first round of successful Safe Haven-Ministation replications and evaluations, led to coverage, on ABC World News Tonight with Peter Jennings, and on BBC; in the Washington Post and Economist; and in Time and Newsweek magazines.

As the Foundation has replicated evidence-based model programs, it has enhanced the institutional capacity of the local indigenous nonprofit organizations that implemented the replications.  With funding from the W.K. Kellogg Foundation, Annie E. Casey Foundation and DeWitt Wallace-Reader's Digest Fund, the Foundation published a report in 2000 on Lessons From the Street:  Capacity Building and Replication.  The report summarized capacity-building technical assistance to local nonprofits – including assistance with organizational management, financial management, staff development, board development, evaluation, replication, fundraising, and media.  A Chronicle of Philanthropy story highlighted how the Foundation found that capacity-building technical assistance works best when a local nonprofit organization is not too small (and still struggling) and not too large (and therefore often resistant to change).

The Foundation's replications and reports on successful evidence-based inner city programs have been incorporated into broader policy updates of the Kerner Riot Commission and National Violence Commission.

Kerner Riot Commission Updates.  Foundation President Alan Curtis authored, co-authored, edited or co-edited the Foundation's 25, 30, and 40 year updates of the Kerner Riot Commission.  He collaborated with the Foundation's former Chairman, former Senator Fred R. Harris, who is the remaining surviving member of the Kerner Commission.

In 1993, the 25-year Kerner Riot Commission update was featured as a cover story on CBS Sunday Morning with Charles Kuralt.  After interviewing Curtis and illustrating Eisenhower programs like Safe Haven-Ministations and Argus, the Kuralt lead reporter, Terence Smith, concluded, "The solutions exist, no magic is required, other than the political will to finally do what the Kerner Commission said should have been started 25 years ago." The 25-year update was covered, as well, in news stories in the New York Times, Washington Post, Los Angeles Times and Independent; in columns by Anthony Lewis of the New York Times and David Broder of the Washington Post, and in many regional newspapers across the nation.

As a follow up to the 25th anniversary Kerner update, the national Family Service America organization asked Curtis to author its annual State of the Families report on what works and how to finance it.  Released in 1995, the report was covered as a CBS Sunday Morning with Charles Osgood cover story and drawn on by Curtis in presentations around the nation.

In 1998, the 30 year Kerner update by Harris and Curtis was presented in 2 volumes, Locked in the Poorhouse and The Millennium Breach. Stories on the 30 year update appeared on ABC, NBC, CNN, NPR, BBC – and in the Washington Post, Los Angeles Times, Christian Science Monitor, Newsweek, Chronicle of Philanthropy, and many American regional newspapers.

The Millennium Breach was featured in a debate on the PBS News Hour with Jim Lehrer.  When reporter Elizabeth Farnsworth asked about the policy that was needed, Curtis replied:

What needs to be done is not talk about liberal versus conservative but what doesn't work versus what works.  What doesn't work is prison building, supply-side economics, and policies like that.  They've failed.  We need to stop doing what doesn't work and invest in what does work:  safe havens after school where kids come for help with their homework, as evaluated by Columbia University; the James Comer Yale University School Development Plan, where teachers and parents take over inner-city schools; the Ford Foundation's Quantum Opportunities program that mentors high schoolers; community development corporations like the New Community Corporation in Newark, which creates jobs; the South Shore Bank, which creates banking for the inner city; and community-based policing by minority officers.  Those are all proven, scientifically-evaluated programs, and if we replicate what works at a scale that's equal to the dimensions of the problem, we can make an impact.        One journal review of Locked in the Poorhouse observed:

It is not surprising that this book should appear to mark the thirtieth anniversary of the Kerner Commission, for the Report called for "compassionate, massive, and sustained federal effort to combat the nation's intertwined problems of racism and poverty."  The new welfare policy with its emphasis on "personal responsibility" is anything but compassionate.  The content of this book is not only a review of the years since Kerner, but also a response to current policy.

The explanation set forth in Locked in the Poorhouse for how and why poverty in the United States not only continues but in fact has worsened, are diametrically opposed to those of [Charles] Murray and others.  The conservatives argue that poverty persists because the programs were flawed (not cost-effective, there was abuse within various programs, and the programs were designed to foster dependency) and because poor people are flawed (lack the necessary skills and motivation to become un-poor).  The liberals argue that failure is due to a lack of governmental and societal commitment to carry out effective programs long enough or well enough to reach intended goals.  They argue that as a nation we must reorder our priorities, "we must return to human investment – in programs that do work."

The book provides both a good history leading to the Kerner Commission and a good review of what has transpired in the intervening years.  It refers to many critical studies and landmark decisions that have over the past thirty years helped to shape social policy.  It also cites examples of programs that have been very effective.

The PBS News Hour with Jim Lehrer debate continued, with, for example, exchanges in the Wall Street Journal, Washington Times and Chronicle of Philanthropy. For example, naysayers said overall unemployment in Detroit before the 1967 riot there had been low, so unemployment could not have been a cause of the unrest, as the Kerner Commission concluded. Yet former Eisenhower Foundation Trustee Elliott Currie pointed out that unemployment was over 30 percent among minority youth in the riot area, and that underemployment was much higher. Curtis pointed out that naysayers ignored the scientific evidence on what works in the Millennium Breach and Locked in the Poorhouse and had nothing to say about how the reports proposed financing what works through a reduction in corporate welfare.

After the release of The Millennium Breach and Locked in the Poorhouse in 1998, the Foundation organized a series of forums designed to build up to and inform the Foundation's planned 40-year update of the Kerner Riot Commission in 2008. An Eisenhower Foundation forum, Schools, Jobs and Prisons, was led by Harris and Curtis at the United States Senate shortly after the release of the volumes and included speakers such as Peter Edelman, Professor at Georgetown University Law School, who had resigned in protest from the Department of Health and Human Services after "welfare reform" had been passed; Dorothy Stoneman, Founder of YouthBuild USA; and former Secretary of Labor Ray Marshall.  A C-SPAN-covered forum at the Century Foundation in New York, attended by Theodore Sorensen, speechwriter for President John F. Kennedy, focused on, among other issues, how federal responses to September 11, 2001 could not be allowed to impede replication of what works in the inner city.  There also was a discussion of how progress in solving American inner city dilemmas could simultaneously increase America's soft power abroad.  A C-SPAN-covered Eisenhower Foundation forum in Washington, DC discussed how the media could more responsibly cover what works and better address poverty, inequality, and race.  A C-SPAN-covered Eisenhower Foundation forum in Washington, DC compared the success of "faith-based" versus secular inner city programs. Participants debated how the Kerner Commission's call for "new will" could be addressed, in part by creating a new sense of public morality in America. A forum at the Sorbonne in Paris compared American policy responses after the 1960s riots, and later riots in Miami and Los Angeles, to policy responses after comparable riots in France and the United Kingdom.  A Bill Moyers Journal-covered hearing at Wayne State University Law School in Detroit asked citizens whether there had been a constructive change in that city since the riots of the 1960s. A Bill Moyers Journal-covered hearing at the New Jersey Historical Society in Newark asked the same question about positive change since the 1960s Newark riots.

During this time, the Foundation also completed a 40-year update of Michael Harrington's 1962 classic:  The Other America:  Poverty in the United States.  The update was a critique of "welfare reform."  It rejected the "work first" framework that had been legislated and provided evidence for a more cost-effective "training first" strategy used by initiatives such as Argus.

During the 1998-2008 period between Kerner updates, at a time when poverty had increased 4 years in a row and there was widespread public debate over the federal response to Hurricane Katrina, Washington Post columnist William Raspberry revisited Locked in the Poorhouse.  Raspberry interviewed Curtis, who re-iterated that America knows what works to reduce inner-city poverty and inequality but does not have the will to replicate success at a scale equal to the dimensions of the problem.  Raspberry concluded, "[O]ne sure bet is that the politicians who propose that we sacrifice our personal convenience and pay higher taxes in the long-term interest of society will be turned out of office."

In 2008, Curtis and Harris released What Together We Can Do, the 40-year update of the Kerner Commission, drawing on the preceding forums and hearings, as well as on recommendations from a national advisory panel.  They saw the 2008 election of the first African-American President as one of a number of indicators of post-Kerner program progress. But they also reported that the child poverty rate and income inequality had increased since the 1968 Kerner report. With the failure of the No Child Left Behind Act, large disparities remained between the educational achievement of white high school students and Latino and African-American high school students.  African-American employment continued to be roughly twice that of whites over the 40 years since the Kerner report.  The prison-industrial complex had dramatically increased incarceration rates. In no small part because of racially biased drug sentencing, African American men aged 25 to 29 were almost 7 times as likely to be incarcerated as whites.

The 40th anniversary Kerner update recommended that:
 The nation's top strategic domestic priority should embrace win-win employment, economic, and education reforms that simultaneously benefit the anxious middle class, the neglected working class and the truly disadvantaged.
 Demand side, Keynesian economic policy should lower unemployment; communicate to the poor, working-class middle class that they need to band together; strengthen union organizing and link job training to job creation.
 A new Employment Training and Job Creation Act should replace the outmoded and ineffective Workforce Investment Act and the Temporary Assistance to Needy Families program.  Trained and retrained American workers should be linked, as first priority, to jobs in sectors that need to be developed in the national interest –like health care, housing, school repair and construction, mass transit, energy and green technologies.
 The failed No Child Left Behind Act should be replaced by an Education Equity Act. The federal government should begin to finance a system that creates equity in dollar investment per pupil across all school districts, as is done in most advanced industrialized countries. The Act should build on successful state equity models, like those in Connecticut and North Carolina.
 Safe Haven Investment Neighborhoods should be funded across the nation. The Investment Neighborhoods should include people in deepest poverty, other impoverished citizens and working-class families.  Drawing in part on the models like the Harlem Children's Zone, Safe Haven Investment Neighborhoods should replicate best practices – programs proved to work.  In each Safe Haven Investment Neighborhood, multiple and interdependent solutions should target multiple problems.
 A new Safe Haven Investment Corporation should co-target federal with local public and private funding – channeling that funding in no small part to grassroots community-based 501(c)(3) nonprofit organizations with demonstrated institutional capacity located in each Safe Haven Investment Neighborhood.
 The tax breaks given to the wealthiest Americans in 2001 and 2003 should be reversed. This could save about $3.5 trillion over the next 10 years. Tax loopholes that give America one of the lowest effective corporate tax rates in the industrialized world should be eliminated.  At the same time, we need to reduce taxes on the great majority of Americans.
 To create a national will, a new Fair Economic Deal movement should articulate a narrative that unites the middle class, the working class and the poor as partners in the American story.  The movement should be based on the values of two Republican Presidents and two Democratic Presidents – Abraham Lincoln, Theodore Roosevelt, Franklin Roosevelt and John Kennedy.  Abraham Lincoln invested in public infrastructure and crusaded against racial injustice. Theodore Roosevelt called for the regulation of corporate greed. Franklin Roosevelt created an American social contract. John Kennedy focused on "what together we can do" to serve our country.
The PBS Bill Moyers Journal covered the 40-year Kerner Commission update. Moyers sent a crew to cover pre-report Foundation hearings in Detroit and Newark (where some of the worst riots of the 1960s occurred).  After an in-depth interview with Harris and coverage of the Detroit and Newark hearings, Moyers observed:

We remember the Kerner Report for its searing conclusion that "our nation is moving toward two societies, one black, one white – separate and unequal." African-Americans at the time were fast becoming concentrated and isolated in metropolitan ghettoes, and the Kerner Commission said that by 1985, without new policies, our cities would have black majorities ringed with largely all-white suburbs.

The commissioners acknowledged that government policies like urban gentrification, and the construction of huge high-rise projects had helped to blight stable black communities. So they offered some specific and practical remedies – new jobs, affordable housing, and new steps to confront the destructive ghetto environment. But following the civil rights movement of the mid-sixties – the peaceful marches and demonstrations, the Civil Rights Act of 1964, and the Voting Rights Act of 1965 – the riots triggered a mounting white backlash. LBJ's escalation of the war in Vietnam added fuel to the fires.

The Kerner Report was published on March 1, 1968. Hardly five weeks later – on the fourth of April, forty years ago next week – Martin Luther King was assassinated. Flames again engulfed dozens of cities, and the possibility of large-scale change perished in the blood and ashes and racist toxins. The president had told the Kerner Commission: "Let your search be free ... as best you can, find the truth and express it in your report." They did. But the truth was not enough. The country lost the will for it.

The 40-year Kerner Riot Commission update also was the focus of an op-ed in the Washington Post by former Senator, Kerner Commissioner and Eisenhower Foundation Trustee Edward Brooke.  Brooke, a Republican, reviewed progress, but cautioned that "for America's poor – those who do not know what health care is because for them it doesn't exist, those for whom prison is a more likely prospect than college, those who have been abandoned to the worst of decaying, crime-ridden urban centers because of the flight of middle-class blacks, whites and Hispanics – the future may be as bleak as it was for their counterparts in the 1960s."

The 40-year update was covered, as well, in Newsweek, the Guardian, USA Today and in newspapers in cities with high levels of poverty, inequality and racial tension – like the Detroit News and the Milwaukee Journal-Sentinel.

As with earlier Commission updates, debates on the Kerner 40th continued in the media.  For example, naysayers argued in USA Today that, unlike the Kerner focus on blocked educational and economic opportunity and racism, the major problem among inner-city African Americans was "single parent homes."  In response, former Eisenhower Foundation Trustee Elliott Currie replied that naysayers wrongly blamed the "heedless behavior of black men."

Currie pointed out that naysayers formerly had blamed the "welfare" system – but, by 2008, "welfare" had been ended for over 10 years.  Returning to the logic of the Kerner Commission, Currie concluded that the real problems were:
 Jobless rates among black men remain stratospheric even in times of economic growth;
 The retreat from an already minimal commitment to investment in job creation and training; and
 A stunning rise in the incarceration of black men with no corresponding effort to reintegrate them on their release into productive roles in the community.
As with earlier updates, Curtis followed the Kerner 40-year report with presentations around the nation, for example, at the Stanford Graduate School of Education, the Economic Policy Institute in Washington DC, the City Club of Cleveland, the Institute of Politics in New Hampshire and on media, like the documentary film, Deforce, on the Detroit riots, which was broadcast on PBS and on the Documentary Channel in 2012.

National Violence Commission Updates.  Curtis edited the Foundation's 15-year update of the National Violence Commission, published by Yale University Press in 1985, and with Elliott Currie, co-authored the Foundation's 30-year update in 1999.

The 1985 National Violence Commission update was covered by the CBS Evening News with Dan Rather and presented in a forum at the Kennedy School of Government at Harvard, a forum at the John F. Kennedy Library in Boston, and a forum at the United States Senate at which Senator Edward M. Kennedy was the keynote speaker. The Senate forum was published in a special issue of the Annals of the American Academy of Political and Social Science edited by Curtis and covered in a story in Foundation News.  The Foundation News story concluded:

The policy message that emerged from the [Senate forum] participants was clear, using a public-private approach, efforts should be made to combine employment, community involvement and family to prevent crime; move away from a federal policy of increased incarceration; reverse the "trickle down" policy of federal anti-crime programs affecting neighborhoods to a "bubble-up" process emanating from the local level; and formulate a new cooperative role for police as supporters, not strictly enforcers.

Titled To Establish Justice, To Insure Domestic Tranquility, the 1999 update of the National Violence Commission was featured in a debate on the PBS News Hour with Jim Lehrer.  Curtis observed to reporter Ray Suarez:

The original Violence Commission predicted that we would have a city of the future in which the middle class would escape to the suburbs, drive to work in sanitized quarters, and work in buildings protected by high tech. That city of the future has come true. An editorial in the Detroit Free Press said that city was Detroit.

Domestic tranquility is roughly the same [in 1999 as in 1969] in spite of the increase in prison buildings. On the other hand, we haven't had an increase in justice. We have 25 percent of all our young children, living in poverty. We have the greatest inequality in terms of wealth and income and wages in the world. One of every three African-Americans are in prison, on probation or on parole at any one time – and one out of every two in cities.

That is a direct result of the racial bias in our sentencing system and our mandatory minimum sentences.  For example, crack-cocaine sentences are longer and crack cocaine is used more by minorities. Powder cocaine sentences are shorter, and powder cocaine is used more by whites. The result is that our prison populations are disproportionately filled with racial minorities.  Yet, at the same time, prison building has become a kind of economic development policy for [white] communities which send lobbyists to Washington.

In addition, the National Violence Commission updates were covered by news stories in the Washington Post, Los Angeles Times, Newsweek and USA Today, interviews on NPR, and editorials in the Detroit Free Press, Philadelphia Daily News and Chicago Tribune, among other media.

For example, the 1999 Detroit Free Press Editorial focused on the Violence Commission's 1969 "city of the future" prediction of "suburban neighborhoods, increasingly far-removed from the central city, with homes fortified by an array of security devices; high-speed police-patrolled expressways becoming sterilized corridors connecting safe areas [and] urban streets that will be unsafe in differing degrees ... That was in 1969.  Sounds line any metropolitan area you know?"

In 2012, after the massacre of 20 school children in Newtown, Connecticut, the Washington Post published a commentary by Curtis that reminded the nation of how, in 1969, a majority of National Violence Commission members, including both Republicans and Democrats, recommended confiscation of most handguns, restrictions on new handgun ownership to those who could demonstrate reasonable need, and identification of rifle and shotgun owners.  Given that America is the only advanced industrialized nation in the world without effective firearms regulations and given that America, not surprisingly, therefore leads the industrialized world in firearms killings, the Foundation believes a new grassroots coalition against firearms in America should build on the recommendations of the National Violence Commission and better integrate the advocacy of, among others, the Brady Campaign, Mayors Against Illegal Guns, the Children's Defense Fund, racial minorities, women, outraged parents, teachers, youthful voters, grandparents and voters who view firearms control as a key policy against terrorist acts and mass killings.

References

External links
Eisenhower Foundation Web Site

Non-profit organizations based in Washington, D.C.
Foundations based in the United States